The Norwegian National Opera and Ballet is a Norwegian opera company and ballet company. The first fully professional company each for opera and ballet in Norway and the only such professional organisation in the country, it is currently resident at the Oslo Opera House, since the spring of 2008.

History
Founded in 1957, the company had Kirsten Flagstad as its first general manager, from 1958 to 1960, and placed an emphasis on presenting operas and ballets written by Norwegian composers, and Norwegian as the standard language of the opera singers.  Subsequent general managers have included Bjørn Simensen.  The Ballet School at the Norwegian National Opera & Ballet was founded in 1965.  In January 2009, the Norwegian Opera and Ballet was reorganized, during the tenure of Tom Remlov as general managing director. The company's current general manager is Nils Are Karstad Lysø.

In the 1980s and 1990s, Den Norske Opera campaigned for a number of years for construction of a new opera house, with preference in the Bjørvika district, a harbour area of downtown Oslo. The Oslo Opera House was opened in the spring of 2008.  In 2008 Radio Marconi, an Italian company, installed a seatback multimedia system, from an idea of Geir Mortil of the Norwegian National Opera & Ballet, allowing audiences to follow opera libretto in other languages in addition to the original language.

The current chief executive officer of the company is Geir Bergkastet.  Past artistic directors of the opera company have included Paul Curran (2009–2011) Anne Gjevang (as interim director), and Per Boye Hansen. and Annilese Miskimmon.  Randi Stene is the current opera director of the company.  The company's current director of ballet is Ingrid Lorentzen, who succeeded Espen Giljane in the post.  Past music directors have included John Fiore.  In February 2022, the company announced the appointment of Edward Gardner as its artistic advisor, with immediate effect, and as its next music director, effective 1 August 2024.

Images

See also
Henny Mürer
Radio Marconi

References

External links
 Norwegian National Opera and Ballet website 
 Norwegian National Opera and Ballet website 

1957 establishments in Norway
Musical groups established in 1957
Norwegian music
Norwegian opera companies
Culture in Oslo
Musical groups from Oslo